Suchodoły  is a village in the administrative district of Gmina Krośniewice, within Kutno County, Łódź Voivodeship, in central Poland.

References

Villages in Kutno County